Richard C. Jasperse (born July 22, 1956) is an American politician who has served in the Georgia House of Representatives since 2010.

References

1956 births
Living people
Republican Party members of the Georgia House of Representatives
21st-century American politicians